Polytechnic University of the Philippines, Bansud Campus or PUP Bansud is PUP campus located in the municipality of Bansud, Oriental Mindoro, Philippines

The campus was created through a Memorandum of Agreement (MOA) between the University and the Municipal Government of Bansud.

Academics
College of Computer Management and Information Technology
 Bachelor of Science in Information Technology

College of Education
 Bachelor in Secondary Education

College of Technology
 Diploma in Office Management Technology

References

External links
 Polytechnic University of the Philippines Official Website

Universities and colleges in Oriental Mindoro
Polytechnic University of the Philippines